Gustavo Maia da Silva (born 22 January 2001) is a Brazilian professional footballer who plays as a winger for Spanish team Valencia Mestalla, on loan from Barcelona Atlètic.

Club career

São Paulo
Born in Brasília, Brazil, Maia joined São Paulo's youth setup at age 14. He played a total of 103 matches for São Paulo as he progressed through the age groups and in 2018 with the Under-17 side, he notched 30 goals in 36 games. In March 2020, Maia was included in the first team squad for a Campeonato Paulista match against Botafogo. He was an unused substitute in a 1–0 away loss.

Barcelona
On 6 August 2020, La Liga club FC Barcelona announced the signing of Maia for a fee of €4.5 million with a buyout clause of €300 million, and he was assigned to the reserves in the third division. He made his debut for Barça B in the opening matchday fixture against Gimnàstic de Tarragona on 18 October. He replaced Matheus Pereira in a 1–0 home victory.

Loan to Internacional
On 30 August 2021, Maia joined Série A club Internacional on loan until 31 December 2022, following a disappointing season with Barcelona. Maia scored his first goal on 24 October, a last minute equalizer in a 2–2 draw against Corinthians.

References

External links
FC Barcelona official profile
Sport Club Internacional official profile
 

2001 births
Living people
Footballers from Brasília
Brazilian footballers
Brazilian expatriate footballers
Expatriate footballers in Spain
Brazilian expatriate sportspeople in Spain
Association football forwards
São Paulo FC players
FC Barcelona Atlètic players
Sport Club Internacional players
Segunda División B players
Campeonato Brasileiro Série A players